The Pierrepont Handicap was an American Thoroughbred horse race first run in 1904 at the Jamaica Race Course in Jamaica, Queens, New York operated by the Metropolitan Jockey Club which had begun racing operations the previous year. The race was open to three-year-olds of either sex and run on dirt over a distance of 1 1/8 miles.

Race history
The inaugural running of the Pierrepont was the feature event of the October 17, 1904 racecard and was won by Dolly Spanker who was trained by future U.S. Racing Hall of Fame inductee T. J. Healey. In 1905's second edition, the two time Champion racemare Eugenia Burch set a new track record while carrying top weight in a field of thirteen.

Disruption
The 1880s saw intense lobbying by a moralist movement to have betting on horse racing banned in the states of New Jersey and New York. They achieved their goals in New Jersey when the 1893 election gave Republicans control of the New Jersey Legislature who then passed legislation on March 21, 1894 that banned betting on horse racing in that state. The bill was signed into law by Democratic Governor George Werts, the effect of which was the complete cessation of horse racing in New Jersey that would last for more than five decades until the law was rescinded in 1946. The moralists then stepped up their activities to obtain the same ban in New York state which caused years of uncertainty. With the state's Hart–Agnew anti-wagering legislation in process, the Jamaica Race Course saw its opening day betting drop from $20,000 in 1907 to just $900 in 1908. For the track's fall racing program, the Pierrepont Handicap had to be dropped from the schedule. Although the race returned in 1909, and was won by James R. Keene's future U.S. Racing Hall of Fame inductee Maskette, it would be the last time it was held until 1918. That year Roamer, another future Hall of Fame inductee, won what was the sixth running of the Pierrepont Handicap.

The severe financial difficulties of the Great Depression would spell the end for the Pierrepont Handicap in 1932. The final running was won by Sonny Whitney's four-year-old horse Halcyon.

Records
Speed record:
 1 1/8 miles: 1:51.00 – Distraction (1929)
 1 1/4 miles: 2:04.00 – Blind Play (1925)

Most wins:
 No horse won this race more than once

Most wins by a jockey:
 3 – Laverne Fator (1923, 1925, 1927)

Most wins by a trainer:
 4 – T. J. Healey (1904, 1919, 1928, 1932)

Most wins by an owner:
 2 – Richard T. Wilson Jr. (1904, 1919)
 2 – James R. Keene (1907, 1909)
 2 – Belair Stud Stable (1924, 1931)

Winners

References

Open mile category horse races
Discontinued horse races in New York City
Jamaica Race Course
Recurring sporting events established in 1904
Recurring sporting events disestablished in 1932
1904 establishments in New York City
1932 disestablishments in New York (state)